The 1927 Mississippi College Choctaws football team was an American football team that represented Mississippi College in the Southern Intercollegiate Athletic Association during the 1927 college football season. In their third year under head coach George Bohler, the team compiled an 8–0 record and finished as SIAA co-champion.

Schedule

References

Mississippi College
Mississippi College Choctaws football seasons
College football undefeated seasons
Mississippi College Choctaws football